Cotegipe (former Campo Largo) is a microregion and a municipality in the Brazilian state of Bahia in the north-east region of Brazil.  Part of the Extremo Oeste Baiano mesoregion, the town was founded in 1820 and had a population of 13,769 as of the 2020.

Municipalities in the Cotegipe microregion

Angical
Brejolândia
Cotegipe
Cristópolis
Mansidão
Santa Rita de Cássia
Tabocas do Brejo Velho
Wanderley

References

Populated places established in 1820
Municipalities in Bahia